IXN may refer to:
 the abbreviation for isoxanthohumol, a prenylated flavanone
 the IATA code for Khowai Airport, India